The 1915 All-Ireland Junior Hurling Championship was the fourth staging of the All-Ireland Junior Championship since its establishment by the Gaelic Athletic Association in 1912.

Clare entered the championship as the defending champions.

The All-Ireland final was played on 20 August 1916 at Athlone Sportsfield, between Tipperary and Offaly, in what was their first ever championship meeting. Tipperary won the match by 1-06 to 2-02 to claim their second championship title overall and a first title since 1913.

Results

All-Ireland Junior Hurling Championship

All-Ireland semi-finals

All-Ireland final

References

Junior
All-Ireland Junior Hurling Championship